Roeland "Roel" Vertegaal (born July 13, 1968) is a Dutch-Canadian interaction designer, scientist, musician and entrepreneur working in the area of Human-Computer Interaction. He is best known for his pioneering work on flexible and paper computers, with systems such as PaperWindows (2004), PaperPhone (2010) and PaperTab (2012).

References 

1968 births
Living people
Dutch computer scientists
Human–computer interaction researchers
Academic staff of Queen's University at Kingston
People from Leiden
Dutch expatriates in Canada